2,6-Xylenol is a chemical compound which is one of the six isomers of xylenol.  It is also commonly known as 2,6-dimethylphenol (DMP).  It is a colorless solid.

Production 
2,6-DMP is produced by the methylation of phenol.  With production >100,000 tons/y, it is the most important xylenol. The methylation is carried out by contacting gaseous phenol and methanol at elevated temperatures in the presence of a solid acid catalyst:

Challenges associated with the production is the similarity of the boiling points of cresols and this xylenol.

Reactions 
2,6-Xylenol is susceptible to oxidative coupling leading to polymers and dimers. 

Acid-catalyzed condensation of 2,6-xylenol gives tetramethylbisphenol A]]. An analogue of bis(phenol A, this bisphenol is used in the production of some polycarbonates. 2,6-Xylenol reacts with ammonia to give 2,6-dimethylaniline.

Toxicity
Its LD50 (oral, rats) ranges from 296-1750 mg/kg.

References

Alkylphenols